Sir Campbell Arthur Stuart  (5 July 1885 – 14 September 1972) was a Canadian newspaper magnate. He ran propaganda operations for the British during both World Wars.

Early life 
In 1885 Campbell Arthur Stuart was born in Montreal, Canada to stockbroker Ernest Henry Stuart and Letitia Mary S. Brydges. He was descended from British Empire loyalists who moved to Canada from the United States of America following the American War of Independence.

First World War 
In 1915, Stuart raised an Irish-Canadian regiment drawn from both the Protestant and Roman Catholic communities in Quebec. En route to France he arranged for the officers and men of the regiment to march through Ireland as a show of solidarity.

The effect of this effort to build a cross denominational consensus caught the attention of Canadian Prime Minister Sir Robert Borden. Borden arranged for Stuart to travel to the Vatican City to seek an audience with Pope Benedict XV and raise Papal interest in French Canada's war effort. Vatican officials were reportedly astonished at the speed in which he obtained his audience.

After his Vatican mission, Borden dispatched Stuart to Washington D.C. as Assistant Military Attaché. This made Stuart the first Canadian to be officially appointed to the British Diplomatic Service. Lord Northcliffe arrived in the United States and had Stuart transferred to his mission as Military Secretary in New York City. He then moved with Northcliffe to London to work in a propaganda role as Deputy Director of Propaganda in Enemy Countries.

At the end of the First World War, Campbell was a Lieutenant-Colonel and had been Mentioned in Dispatches.

Inter War Years

Newspapers 
Stuart was demobilized in 1920 and Northcliffe offered to make him a managing director of The Times (a role which included supervision of editorial staff and news services). The following year Stuart was also made an managing editor at the Daily Mail.

Northcliffe said of Stuart -

After Northcliffe's death in 1922, Stuart was instrumental in negotiations which saw a controlling interest in The Times moving to Major Astor. Stuart was an active member of The Times board as a director for thirty-seven years until 1960.

Canadian Historical Society 
In 1924, Stuart was a leading participant in the foundation of the Canadian Historical Society in France. He arranged for the society to be launched with a meal at the Palace of Versailles in the Galerie des Batailles. In order to secure use of the palace, Stuart insured the building and contents with Lloyd's of London. The meal was attended by descendants of the English and French families who had been prominent in Canadian history as well as members of the French and Canadian governments. Stuart served on the society's committee until 1958, including 10 years as chairman.

Communications Work 
In 1928, Stuart served as the Canadian representative at the Imperial Wireless Cables Conference. Then in 1933 he was elected chairman of the Imperial Communications Advisory Committee.

Other Organisations 
Further to his other roles Stuart also served on the committees of the following groups -

 Beit Foundation for Scientific Research
 Wolfe Memorial Committee (at Greenwich, London)
 Quebec House Committee (at Westerham)
 Hudson's Bay Record Society
 King George's Jubilee Trust and Fields Foundation

Second World War 
With the outbreak of the Second World War, Stuart was appointed Director of Propaganda in Enemy Countries. He recruited to his section Ray Shaw of The Times to be his deputy, Sir Dallas Brooks and Noel Coward before leaving his post in 1940.

Honours 
He was appointed Knight Commander of the Order of the British Empire in the 1918 New Year Honours and Knight Grand Cross of the Order of St Michael and St George in 1939. Stuart was the Honorary Vice-President of the Champlain Society from 1964 until his death in 1972.

Personal life 
Stuart never married and enjoyed entertaining with his mother acting as hostess. The Times (15 Sept. 1972) noted -

He would entertain at his home, The Grove, in the Highgate area of London. It was at his home where he died on 14 September 1972.

See also
 British anti-invasion preparations of World War II#Deception and disinformation
 Special Operations Executive#History

External links

References 
 'STUART, Sir Campbell', Who Was Who, A & C Black, 1920–2008; online edn, Oxford University Press, Dec 2007 accessed 10 Jan 2012
 https://archive.today/20130131010418/http://press.oxforddnb.com/index/31/101031732/

1885 births
1972 deaths
Canadian Knights Grand Cross of the Order of St Michael and St George
Canadian Knights Commander of the Order of the British Empire
Canadian socialites
20th-century Canadian businesspeople